The 1980 World Amateur Snooker Championship was the ninth edition of the tournament also known as the IBSF World Snooker Championship. The 1980 tournament was played in Launceston, Tasmania from 26 October to 9 November 1980. Jimmy White defeated Ron Atkins 11–2 in the final to win the title.

Tournament summary
The first World Amateur Snooker Championship was held in 1963, and, after the second event in 1966, had been played every two years since. The 1980 tournament was held at the Albert Hall in Launceston, Tasmania from 26 October to 9 November 1980, with 28 participants playing in four seven-player round-robin groups followed by a knockout to determine the champion. Cliff Wilson, the 1978 champion, had turned professional in 1979.

Jimmy White, aged 17, was the top seed in the event, and reached the final where he played Ron Atkins. Atkins, president of the Tasmanian snooker association, and a resident of Launceston, had entered the competition as late replacement, filling a place vacated by Chris Cooper from the Isle of Man. White led 9–1 after the first session and won the match 11–2, becoming the youngest player to win the World Amateur Championship. His application to turn professional after the tournament had previously been accepted by the World Professional Billiards and Snooker Association.

Eugene Hughes compiled a record World Amateur championship  of 127 against Arvind Savur in the group stage, which remained the highest break of the 1980 tournament.

Qualifying groups
The final tables are shown below. Players in bold qualified for the next round. The top eight seedings are shown in parentheses.

Group A

Group B

Group C

Group D

Knockout
Players in bold denote match winners.

Final
Scores in bold indicate winning  scores.

Notes

References

Snooker amateur tournaments
International sports competitions hosted by Australia
1980 in snooker
Sport in Launceston, Tasmania